The Elle King EP is an EP by singer-songwriter Elle King, her debut release, released June 12, 2012. The song "Playing for Keeps" was used as the theme song for Mob Wives Chicago. The second song that King wrote on the banjo, "Good to Be a Man" was the song that got King signed with RCA.

King mixed up various styles on the songs on her EP, from a defiant growl to mournful to lascivious. She doesn't believe that "people listen to albums as a kind of whole, cohesive record anymore, anyway." She thinks that "the one thing that ties through all my different sounds is my voice, and I think we're all just trying to figure out how to tie everything around that."

Track listing

Personnel 
Musicians
Elle King: vocals, banjo, acoustic guitar

Production
Chris Chris DeStefano: Producer, mixing (track 1)
Andy Baldwin: Producer (track 2), mixing (track 4)
Stephen Marcussen: mastering

References 

2012 debut EPs
Elle King albums
RCA Records albums